Tortella is a genus of mosses belonging to the family Pottiaceae. The genus was first described by Karl Müller and has a cosmopolitan distribution

Species
The following species are recognised in the genus Tortella:
 
Tortella afrocespitosa 
Tortella alpicola 
Tortella aprica 
Tortella arctica 
Tortella bambergeri 
Tortella brotheri 
Tortella bryotropica 
Tortella cirrifolia 
Tortella contortifolia 
Tortella cryptocarpa 
Tortella × cuspidatissima 
Tortella cyrtobasis 
Tortella dakinii 
Tortella densa 
Tortella eckendorffii 
Tortella erosodentata 
Tortella eutrichostomum 
Tortella fasciculata 
Tortella flavovirens 
Tortella fleischeri 
Tortella fragilis 
Tortella fragillima 
Tortella fristedtii 
Tortella fruchartii 
Tortella germainii 
Tortella goniospora 
Tortella grossiretis 
Tortella guatemalensis 
Tortella himantina 
Tortella hosseusii 
Tortella humilis 
Tortella hyalinoblasta 
Tortella inclinata 
Tortella inflexa 
Tortella involutifolia 
Tortella japonica 
Tortella jugicola 
Tortella kmetiana 
Tortella knightii 
Tortella lilliputana 
Tortella limbata 
Tortella limosella 
Tortella lindmaniana 
Tortella linearis 
Tortella malacophylla 
Tortella mediterranea 
Tortella mooreae 
Tortella nano-tortuosa 
Tortella natalensicespitosa 
Tortella nitida 
Tortella novae-valesiae 
Tortella pallido-viridis 
Tortella perrufula 
Tortella pilcomayica 
Tortella platyphylla 
Tortella pseudocaespitosa 
Tortella pseudofragilis 
Tortella richardsii 
Tortella rigens 
Tortella rubripes 
Tortella simplex 
Tortella smithii 
Tortella somaliae 
Tortella spinidens 
Tortella spitsbergensis 
Tortella subflavovirens 
Tortella theriotii 
Tortella torquescens 
Tortella tortuloides 
Tortella tortuosa 
Tortella undulatifolia 
Tortella vernicosa 
Tortella walkeri 
Tortella xanthocarpa

References

Pottiaceae
Moss genera